Miranda Joy Ayim (born May 6, 1988) is a Canadian basketball player for Basket Landes in France. Ayim is a captain of the Canada women's national team and competed for Canada in three Olympics between 2012 and 2021.

High school
Ayim attended high school at Saunders Secondary School in London, Ontario. She was a starter for the varsity each of her four years. She was on the honor roll all four years and graduated as the valedictorian of her class.

Pepperdine
Ayim played for the Pepperdine women's basketball team for the four years of her attendance. She set the school record for blocks, with 182 over her career. She scored 1377 points and recorded 735 rebounds, both of which were eighth-best in school history. She earned all West Coast Conference as a player three times, as well as All-Academics honors for the conference three times, the first time a Pepperdine women's basketball player was so honored.

Canada national team
Ayim played on several Canadian national teams in FIBA competitions. In 2007, she played on the team which participated in the FIBA Under-21 World Championship for Women and finished sixth. Ayim averaged 6.2 points and 6.0 rebounds per game. She was also on the team which participated in the FIBA Under-19 World Championship for Women, finishing in ninth place. She averaged 9.8 points and 9.8 rebounds per game.

In 2012, she was selected and played for the Canadian national team, which finished 8th in the 2012 Summer Olympics. She averaged 1.2 points and 1.2 rebounds per game.

Ayim played for Canada at the 2013 FIBA Americas Championship for Women. She averaged 8.3 points and 5.4 rebounds per game, helping the team to a Silver medal at the event. She continued with the team at the 2014 FIBA World Championship for Women, where she averaged 8.3 points and 5.4 rebounds per game.

Ayim was a member of the team which participated in the 2015 Pan American Games held in Toronto in July 2015. The team went undefeated and captured their first-ever Pan American gold medal, defeating the United States 81-73 in front of a large home crowd.

Ayim played for Canada at the 2015 FIBA Americas Women's Championship, held in Edmonton. The team continued their undefeated summer, winning the FIBA Americas title and qualifying directly for the 2016 Olympics.

Ayim became a two-time Olympian, representing Canada at the 2016 Rio Olympics; Canada finished a 3-2 in the group phase and fell to France in the quarterfinal match-up, finishing in 7th place.

In 2017, Ayim captained Team Canada at the 2017 FIBA Women's AmeriCup held in Buenos Aires, Argentina. The team went 6-0 in the tournament, defending their Americas title in a thrilling gold medal game against Argentina in front of a hostile and passionate home crowd. Ayim was named to the tournament All-Star Five team.

At the 2018 FIBA Women's Basketball World Cup, Canada finished with a 3-0 record in the group stage. Canada fell to host Spain in the quarterfinal, ultimately finishing the tournament in 7th place.

Ayim competed in her third Olympic Games in 2021; she was Canada's flag bearer in Tokyo alongside Nathan Hirayama.

Professional
Ayim was not selected in the 2011 WNBA Draft. She was signed to a training camp contract by Tulsa after returning from a year of playing professionally in Turkey.

Ayim played three years in Turkey from 2010-2013 before making her French LFB debut with Toulouse in the 2013-14 season. She moved to Basket Landes for the 2015-16 season, marking her EuroCup debut.

Team Canada Stats

Professional Stats

Pepperdine University Stats
Source

References

External links
Official Website

Pepperdine Waves bio

1988 births
Living people
Basketball people from Ontario
Basketball players at the 2012 Summer Olympics
Basketball players at the 2015 Pan American Games
Basketball players at the 2016 Summer Olympics
Basketball players at the 2020 Summer Olympics
Black Canadian basketball players
Canadian expatriate basketball people in France
Canadian expatriate basketball people in Turkey
Canadian expatriate basketball people in the United States
Canadian women's basketball players
Forwards (basketball)
Medalists at the 2015 Pan American Games
Olympic basketball players of Canada
Pan American Games gold medalists for Canada
Pan American Games medalists in basketball
Pepperdine Waves women's basketball players
Sportspeople from Chatham-Kent
Tulsa Shock players
Undrafted Women's National Basketball Association players